John Jairo Castillo (born April 20, 1984) is a Colombian footballer who plays as a striker, most recently for Cultural Santa Rosa in the Peruvian Segunda División.

Castillo's first name is sometimes spelled Jhon and his nickname is "Tigrillo".

Club career
He signed with the team in January 2008 on a long-team contract.  He has played for numerous Colombian teams such as  Deportes Tolima in the Copa Mustang and also for Bolivian club Oriente Petrolero and most recently for Venezuelan club Guaros FC.  Recently training with deportivo Cali.

References

External links
 BDFA profile

1984 births
Living people
Footballers from Cali
Colombian footballers
Colombia international footballers
Millonarios F.C. players
América de Cali footballers
Cortuluá footballers
Oriente Petrolero players
Once Caldas footballers
Deportes Tolima footballers
Colo-Colo footballers
Everton de Viña del Mar footballers
Águilas Doradas Rionegro players
Universitario Popayán footballers
Portuguesa F.C. players
Leones Negros UdeG footballers
Categoría Primera A players
Categoría Primera B players
Chilean Primera División players
Colombian expatriate footballers
Colombian expatriate sportspeople in Chile
Expatriate footballers in Chile
Expatriate footballers in Bolivia
Expatriate footballers in Venezuela
Expatriate footballers in Mexico
Colombian expatriate sportspeople in Bolivia
Colombian expatriate sportspeople in Mexico
2003 CONCACAF Gold Cup players
Association football forwards
Colombian expatriate sportspeople in Venezuela
Guaros F.C. players